Pseudamycla is a genus of small sea snails, marine gastropod mollusks in the family Columbellidae, the dove snails.

Species
Species within the genus Pseudamycla include:
 Pseudamycla dermestoidea (Lamarck, 1822)
 Pseudamycla formosa (Gaskoin, 1851)
 Pseudamycla miltostoma (Tenison-Woods, 1877)

The Indo-Pacific Molluscan Database (OBIS) also includes the following species with names in current use : 
 Pseudamycla rorida (Reeve, 1859 in 1843-65)

References

External links
 

Columbellidae